One Voice: The Greatest Clips is a DVD release by Australian singer John Farnham. The DVD was released in Australia on 20 October 2003 in conjunction with a 2 disc greatest hits compilation titled, One Voice: The Greatest Hits. This DVD contains all of John Farnham's music videos and clips from 1966 to 2003.

DVD track listing
 "You're The Voice" – 5:06
 "Pressure Down" – 5:01
 "A Touch of Paradise" – 4:40
 "Two Strong Hearts" – 3:42
 "Age Of Reason" – 5:10
 "That's Freedom" – 4:23
 "Chain Reaction" – 4:02
 "Burn for You" – 3:35
 "Seemed Like a Good Idea (At the Time)"  – 5:33
 "Talk of the Town" – 3:40<
 "Angels" Music Video – 4:55
 "Have a Little Faith (In Us)" – 4:43
 "A Simple Life" – 3:36
 "Heart's On Fire" – 4:12<
 "When Something Is Wrong with My Baby"  (with Jimmy Barnes)  – 5:01
 "Everytime You Cry"  (with Human Nature)  – 4:06
 "Please Don't Ask Me" – 3:26
 "All Kinds Of People" – 4:09
 "Trying to Live My Life Without You" – 3:43 
 "Man of the Hour" – 4:24
 "Don't Let It End"  – 4:43
 "Beyond the Call" – 4:40
 "Sadie (The Cleaning Lady)"  – 3:13
 "One" – 2:44
 "Help!" – 4:23 
 "Communication"  (with Danni'elle)  – 4:1
 "In Days to Come" – 4:03
 "No Ordinary World" – 3:30
 "Only Women Bleed" – 4:20
 From the Vault  (Bonus Track)  – 17:20
 50th Birthday Concert Opener  (Bonus Track)  – 4:06
 Behind The Reason: The Making of John Farnham's Age of Reason  (Bonus Track)   – 12:25
 The Last Time Launch Presentation  (Bonus Track)  – 3:33

Charts

Weekly charts

Year-end charts

Certifications

References

John Farnham video albums
2003 video albums
Music video compilation albums